Edmund Comber (8 January 1886 – 1 March 1942), known professionally as Bobbie Comber, was a British comedian, singer and actor.

He was born in Bury St Edmunds, Suffolk.  He first appeared on stage in 1904 in Bournemouth, and worked as a civil servant in the War Office before forming his own concert party in 1912.   He served in the military in the First World War, and then toured the country in musical revues and the comedy Chu Chin Chow.   He first appeared on stage in London at the Adelphi Theatre in a production of The Naughty Princess in 1920.

Comber's first broadcasts were in excerpts from the show Clowns in Clover, and he made more regular appearances as a comedian on BBC radio from 1929, sometimes with Paul England, Claude Hulbert and Eddie Childs (later replaced by Arthur Clay, and subsequently by H. B. Longhurst) as "Those Four Chaps".   He also performed in a double act with Hulbert, and recorded light comedy songs, such as a cleaned-up version of "Barnacle Bill".  He appeared in films, including Elstree Calling (1930), Lazybones (1935), and Be Careful, Mr. Smith (1935).

The BBC's entertainment programmes were broadcast from north Wales during the Second World War, and Comber died there, in Bangor, in 1942 aged 56.

Selected filmography
 Brother Alfred (1932)
 The Fortunate Fool (1933) as Marlowe
 There Goes Susie (1934)
 Lilies of the Field (1934)
 Be Careful, Mr. Smith (1935)
 The Ace of Spades (1935)
 Sporting Love (1936)
 Mother, Don't Rush Me (1936)
 A Romance in Flanders (1937)
 The Singing Cop (1938)

References

External links
 

1886 births
1942 deaths
English male film actors
Actors from Bury St Edmunds
English comedy musicians
20th-century English male actors
20th-century British comedians
Musicians from Bury St Edmunds